Earl of Dartmouth is a title in the Peerage of Great Britain. It was created in 1711 for William Legge, 2nd Baron Dartmouth.

History
The Legge family descended from Edward Legge, Vice-President of Munster. His eldest son William Legge was a Royalist army officer and close associate of Prince Rupert of the Rhine. On the Restoration, Charles II offered to create him an earl, but Legge declined.

Barons Dartmouth
His son George Legge was a prominent naval commander, who in 1682 was raised to the Peerage of England as Baron Dartmouth, of Dartmouth in the County of Devon. George's son William, the second Baron, notably served as Secretary of State for the Southern Department between 1710 and 1713 and in 1711 was created Viscount Lewisham, in the County of Kent, and Earl of Dartmouth, in the Peerage of Great Britain.

Earls of Dartmouth
William was succeeded by his grandson, the second Earl. He was the only surviving son of George Legge, Viscount Lewisham (d. 1732), eldest son of the first Earl, who had died before his father. He was also an influential politician and served as Secretary of State for the Colonies and First Lord of Trade between 1772 and 1775. The American Ivy League school Dartmouth College in Hanover, New Hampshire, was named for the second Earl by Congregational minister Eleazar Wheelock.

The second earl's eldest son, the third Earl, was summoned to the House of Lords through a writ of acceleration as Baron Dartmouth in June 1801. Soon after, in July 1801, he succeeded his father in the earldom. Lord Dartmouth held office as President of the Board of Control between 1801 and 1802. On his death, the titles passed to his eldest son, the fourth Earl, who had briefly represented Milborne Port in Parliament before succeeding in the earldom.

The fourth earl's only surviving child from his first marriage, the fifth Earl, was a Conservative politician and also served as Lord Lieutenant of Staffordshire. His eldest son, the sixth Earl, was also a Conservative politician and served twice as Vice-Chamberlain of the Household.

The latter was succeeded by his eldest son, the seventh Earl, who married Lady Ruperta, daughter of the 1st Marquess of Lincolnshire. Lady Ruperta inherited a share of the office of Lord Great Chamberlain from her father, and after his father-in-law's death in 1928, Lord Dartmouth acted as Deputy Lord Great Chamberlain until the death of George V in 1936.

The seventh earl's only son, William Legge, Viscount Lewisham, was killed at El Alamein in 1942, and Dartmouth was consequently succeeded by his younger brother, Humphry, the eight Earl.

As of 2018, the titles are held by Humphry's grandson, the tenth Earl, who succeeded his father in 1997. Lord Dartmouth was a Member of the European Parliament for the UK Independence Party between 2009 and 2019, but left the party in 2018, and is now independent.

Other family members
Several other members of the Legge family have also gained distinction. The Hon. Henry Bilson-Legge, fourth son of the first Earl, was a politician and served three times as Chancellor of the Exchequer. Sir Arthur Kaye Legge, sixth son of the second Earl, was an admiral in the Royal Navy. The Hon. Edward Legge, seventh son of the second Earl, was Bishop of Oxford. The Hon. Heneage Legge, second son of the third Earl, sat as Member of Parliament for Banbury. Arthur Legge, fourth son of the third Earl, was a general in the British Army and Member of Parliament for Banbury. The Hon. Augustus Legge, fifth son of the fourth Earl, was Bishop of Lichfield. The Hon. Heneage Legge, sixth son of the fourth Earl, was Member of Parliament for St George's Hanover Square.

Family seats
The family seat is Blakelea House, near Marsden, West Yorkshire, though there was also a family home at Sandwell Hall (since demolished) in the Sandwell Valley in West Bromwich, and Patshull Hall, near Pattingham, Staffordshire. The district of Dartmouth Park in north London also belonged to the family.

Baron Dartmouth (1682)
George Legge, 1st Baron Dartmouth (1647–1691)
William Legge, 2nd Baron Dartmouth (1672–1750) (created Earl of Dartmouth in 1711)

Earl of Dartmouth (1711)
William Legge, 1st Earl of Dartmouth (1672–1750)
William Legge, 2nd Earl of Dartmouth (1731–1801)
George Legge, 3rd Earl of Dartmouth (1755–1810)
William Legge, 4th Earl of Dartmouth (1784–1853)
George Legge, Viscount Lewisham (1822–1823)
William Walter Legge, 5th Earl of Dartmouth (1823–1891)
William Heneage Legge, 6th Earl of Dartmouth (1851–1936)
William Legge, 7th Earl of Dartmouth (1881–1958)
William Legge, Viscount Lewisham (1913–1942)
Humphry Legge, 8th Earl of Dartmouth (1888–1962)
Gerald Humphry Legge, 9th Earl of Dartmouth (1924–1997)
William Legge, 10th Earl of Dartmouth (born 1949)

The heir presumptive is the present holder's brother, the Hon. Rupert Legge (born 1951).
The heir presumptive's heir apparent is his son, Edward Legge (born 1986).

Male-line family tree

Line of succession

  George Legge, 1st Baron Dartmouth (1647–1691)
  William Legge, 1st Earl of Dartmouth (1672–1750)
 George Legge, Viscount Lewisham (c. 1703 – 1732)
  William Legge, 2nd Earl of Dartmouth (1731–1801)
  George Legge, 3rd Earl of Dartmouth (1755–1810)
  William Legge, 4th Earl of Dartmouth (1784–1853)
  William Walter Legge, 5th Earl of Dartmouth (1823–1891)
  William Heneage Legge, 6th Earl of Dartmouth (1851–1936)
  William Legge, 7th Earl of Dartmouth (1881–1958)
  Humphry Legge, 8th Earl of Dartmouth (1888–1962)
  Gerald Humphry Legge, 9th Earl of Dartmouth (1924–1997)
  William Legge, 10th Earl of Dartmouth (born 1949)
 (1) Hon. Rupert Legge (born 1951)
 (2) Edward Peregrine Legge (born 1986)
 (3) Hon. Henry Legge (born 1968)
 Hon. Sir Henry Charles Legge (1852–1924)
 Lt. Nigel Walter Legge-Bourke (1889–1914)
 Maj. Sir (Edward Alexander) Henry Legge-Bourke (1914–1973)
 ''William Nigel Henry Legge-Bourke (1939–2009)
 (4) Harry Russell Legge-Bourke (born 1972)
 (5) Lachlan Legge-Bourke (born 2003)
 (6) Heneage Legge-Bourke (born 1948)
 (7) Edward Alexander Heneage Legge-Bourke (born 1984)

References

Earldoms in the Peerage of Great Britain
Legge family

Noble titles created in 1711